The 1930 Bulgarian State Football Championship was the eighth edition of the competition. It was consisted by 12 teams, and it was won by AS 23 Sofia. This was the club's first title.

Qualified teams
The winners from each OSO qualify for the State championship.

First round

|}

Quarter-finals

|}

Semi-finals

|}

Final
The final, played on 13 September 1931:

|}

Notes

References
Bulgaria - List of final tables (RSSSF)

Bulgarian State Football Championship seasons
1
Bul